Jana Fesslová (born 13 November 1976 in Ústí nad Labem) is a Paralympian athlete from Czech Republic competing mainly in category F54-56 discus throw events.

Biography
She competed in the 2008 Summer Paralympics in Beijing, China. There she won a bronze medal in the women's F54-56 discus throw event.

She is investigated by the Czech Police for the financial fraud.

References

External links
 

Paralympic athletes of the Czech Republic
Athletes (track and field) at the 2004 Summer Paralympics
Athletes (track and field) at the 2008 Summer Paralympics
Paralympic bronze medalists for the Czech Republic
Living people
Sportspeople from Ústí nad Labem
1976 births
Medalists at the 2008 Summer Paralympics
Paralympic medalists in athletics (track and field)
Czech female discus throwers